Not the Same Person You Used to Know is a South Korean variety show which premiered on Mnet every Thursday at 23:00 (KST) on December 20, 2018.

On May 8, 2019 it was confirmed that the show will return for a second season, with DinDin the only cast member from Season 1 to return. The new members include Lee Sang-min, Boom, Jang Sung-kyu and Jung Hye-sung. The second season, named V2, is expected to air on every Thursday at 20:00 (KST) starting from June 27, 2019. The season ended on August 15, 2019.

Format 
Acquaintances of a celebrity (friends, managers, parents, siblings, etc.) are invited to answer a quiz about the celebrity to see if they know him/her as well as they think they do. For instance, they will have to watch videos of the celebrity and predict his/her next actions.

For Season 2, a slightly different change is that 4 guests related to the celebrity are invited to the show and take on the Non-related Observers (the cast members except Jang Sung-kyu) in a quiz about the celebrity. A total of ₩3,000,000 is up for grabs and the team with more winning money wins the quiz.

Cast

Season 1

Season 2

Episodes

Season 1

Season 2

References

External links 

South Korean reality television series
2018 South Korean television series debuts
Korean-language television shows
South Korean variety television shows
Mnet (TV channel) original programming
2019 South Korean television series endings